The Dacia 1310 is a family of automobiles produced and sold exclusively by Dacia between 1979 and the beginning of 1999, and from 1999 to 2006 jointly by the French manufacturer Renault and its Romanian subsidiary Dacia. In 1979, Dacia presented the 1310 model at the Bucharest Auto Show as the successor of the Dacia 1300. Together with the Dacia 1300, a total of 2,278,691 units were produced, the last sedan being manufactured on July 21, 2004, and the last pick-up truck in December 2006. In the same year, its successor, the Dacia Logan, was launched.

It was produced, like the Dacia 1300, in two body variants, sedan and estate, but was also derived in versions with tailgate (Dacia 1320 and Dacia 1325 Liberta, produced between 1988 and 1996), pick-up (the Dacia Pick-Up range, produced between 1975 and 2006), and coupe (Sport version, produced between 1981 and 1992).

History

After the cooperation with Renault ceased in 1978, Dacia presented a revised version of the 1300 at the 1979 Bucharest Auto Show. In 1982, its name was changed to Dacia 1310, and later also came "1210", "1410" and a few other versions.

In 1983, the whole range was facelifted for the 1984 model year. A coupé version of the car, the 1410 Sport, with two doors and a lowered roof, was also released in 1983. In 1987 the Dacia 1320 liftback was introduced.

In 1989, a new generation Dacia 1310 was launched in estate and sedan versions. It was a minor modification of the previous generation with new headlights. A new liftback version named Dacia 1325 Liberta was introduced in 1990. The 1310 van was also launched in 1990. The fully facelifted Dacia 13xx range was introduced in 1993.

By the 1980s, the model was becoming dated and its chassis was no longer able to meet safety standards of the era, prompting Dacia to start work on a replacement. However, financial and political setbacks caused that replacement, the Dacia Nova, to be delayed until 1994, by which time it was already outdated. Although the newer Nova range (later evolving into Dacia SupeRNova and Dacia Solenza) sold well and displayed better road manners, it never replaced the 1310 range, due to its higher price, smaller interior and other disappointing factors (such as being offered only in a liftback body).

Therefore, Dacia was forced to facelift the 1310 model yet again, in 1999. The last 1310 model was simply named "Berlina" or "Break", for sedan or estate respectively. In an effort to keep up with modern standards, the last version was equipped with fuel injection and a catalytic converter, meeting Euro2 emission standards.

Since the original model in 1969, constant change in automobile size meant that the 1310 was a compact sedan by the end of its production, despite having started life as a mid-size car. For a few months in 2004, Dacia offered three different small sedan models simultaneously.

The model scored solid sale numbers right up to its last day of production, mainly due to its low price, value for money, and easy and inexpensive maintenance. The sedan ("Berlina") and the estate ("Break") had €4,100 and €4,250 price tags respectively in 2004. The Liberta liftback had been dropped in 1996, but production of the sedan and estate was over in 2004. The "Pick-Up" range ended production in December 2006. The Dacia Logan replaced the 1300/1310 model in 2004.

International markets

Israel
In Israel, Dacia vehicles were sold between 1978 and 1989 under the "Delta" brand. The Delta was imported irregularly, and was actually imported four times by different importers.

 In 1978, the vehicle was first marketed in Israel. The sale of the vehicle ended only a year later due to quality problems, which were even publicized on the television show "Chalbotek". 
 In 1982 the car was marketed by importer Triumph under the name "Galidi". 
 In 1988, after a successful advertising campaign in Israel under the slogan "You can do it too '88", the sale of the vehicle was resumed. The company "Kaiser Illin", through its subsidiary "Capris", managed to sell about 6,000 vehicles. In August 1988, the company went bankrupt, and customers paying down payments did not receive the car or the advance money. 
 The last attempt was made by the importer "Mutcars", this time under the original Dacia brand, and the station wagon and pick-up versions under the Shifter name.

United Kingdom
In 1982, the 1310 was introduced to the UK market as the Dacia Denem. Available in 4-door saloon and 5-door estate models, the Denem was marketed as a budget automobile to compete with various Lada, FSO, and Škoda products that were popular around this time. However, due to its aging Renault platform and relatively high price of £3190 when new, the Denem struggled to sell, and was soon discontinued around 1984. As of now, there are currently no Dacia Denems left registered on UK roads,

Engines

First generation (1979)

After the manufacturing license of the Dacia 1300, based on the Renault 12, expired in 1978, the first major restyling took place, and the new model was renamed Dacia 1310. It was presented for the first time in the fall of 1979 at the Exhibition of Economic Achievements National (EREN), held in Bucharest, being designated as the "1980 model".

It brought changes both on the outside and inside. The front of the model was completely redesigned, and it now had a mask with a new shape, four round headlights and higher bumpers that incorporated signal light. At the rear, the two lamps now combined the headlights, turn signals, brake and reverse in a single block, and some restyled ornaments were added to the trunk.

The new model had a radio, rear-view mirror, electric windshield washer, dual-circuit brakes (power brake on some models), exterior and right-hand mirrors (on some models) and headrest seats, and space for rear passengers was increased by 8 cm.

At the technical level, the model also had a number of improvements, such as an electric fan, operated by a thermal relay, an economizer, and a hot air outlet of the filter. The compression ratio of the engine was changed from 8.5:1 to 9:1, which together with the other improvements led to an increase in engine power and a decrease in fuel consumption. The 1,289 cm³ engine had a maximum power of 56 horsepower (compared to 55.2) at 5,250 rpm, and the maximum torque was 94 Nm at 3,500 rpm. This model had over 56 improvements and was seen as a transition model to the city car of exclusively Romanian design, which was to be launched three years later.

In the first half of 1983, the 1410 Sport coupe was put on sale, presented for the first time in 1979 at EREN and in production since 1981. It was made at the Dacia service in Brașov, being initially exhibited under the name of Brașovia. The wheelbase and length of the model were about 200 mm shorter, the height was about 135 mm lower, but the trunk volume remained unchanged. The engine with which the model was equipped was 1.397 cm³ (bore x stroke: 76x77 mm) and produced a maximum power of 65 horsepower at 5,250 rpm, an increase obtained by changing the engine bore (from 73 to 76 mm), changing the ratio compression (at 9.8:1) and equipping with a new carburetor. Reducing the height of the rear suspension lowered its center of gravity, but it is considered to have negatively affected its stability on the go.

The fuel consumption obtained at an average speed of 80 km/h was 7.0 liters per kilometer, the starting time from 0 to 100 km/h was 16.2 seconds, and the maximum speed was about 152- 154 km/h.

Between 1980 and 1984, a series of tests were carried out for the introduction of diesel engines, and models equipped with such engines were presented, but they never reached the series production stage.

Dacia Sport
The Dacia Sport entered production in 1983, following the unveiling of the Dacia Sport-Brașovia prototype in 1979, thus producing two models: Dacia Sport 1310 with 1289 cm engine and a power of 54 hp and Dacia Sport 1410 with engine of 1397 cm³ with a power of 65 hp. Between 1981 and 1985, the model with short doors was produced, and from 1986 until 1992, the model with longer doors was produced. Since 1983, only the 1397 cc 65 hp engine is used, and since 1985, the 5-speed gearbox is available. On this model was also presented an engine of 1580 cc 84 hp with camshaft in the cylinder head, as well as a more powerful version of about 100 hp, but these engines did not reach mass production. There are only the 1400 cc and the 1557 cc mounted on the Nova, and the latter being put on the 1991-1992 model years.

The model that became popular not only for the youth of those years, but especially for the Romanian car competitions of the time (n.r. - Dacia Sport's share in the national rally championship had reached almost 20%) was produced in 5,500 copies, during a period that barely it's been a decade. However, the sales of this model were low, due to the high price, some manufacturing defects, some manufacturing errors (insufficient interior space, unusable trunk). Production was stopped because in the 90's various second-hand sports cars entered the Romanian market, and Dacia was uncompetitive.

Second generation (1984)

The "model 1984" car was presented at the Bucharest International Fair (TIB) in October 1983. It was equipped with a 1,400 cm³ engine, with a maximum power of 64 horsepower at 5,000 rpm and maximum torque, 103 Nm at 3,000 rpm, taken from the Dacia Sport. There was also a 57 horsepower variant. Fuel consumption was 6.1-6.4 liters per 100 kilometers, at a constant speed of 90 km/h. Sometimes it was also called the Dacia 1410, a name used less often, because the variants of 1200, 1400 and 1600 cm³, also had the name Dacia 1310. In 1985, the 5-speed gearbox was launched.

At the aesthetic level, there were some new changes to the body: a spoiler on the trunk, a new front grille, restyled headlight trim and much more. This model had two trim levels: TL and TLE, the first being equipped with a four-speed gearbox, and the second with a five-speed gearbox. The TLE trim was intended almost exclusively for export. The TL trim was equipped with a radio, while the TLE model came with a radio cassette player and the dashboard had integrated indicators for water temperature and oil pressure.

Also presented is a prototype equipped with a diesel engine, 1600 cm³, 54 hp and 101 Nm of torque. With this engine, the car could reach a speed of 140 km/h, falling within the limits of those years.

For the 1985 model year, a 1.575 cm³ engine was presented for the first time, combined with a five-speed gearbox, camshaft in the cylinder head, and with a maximum power of 80 horsepower at 5,000 rpm and a maximum torque of 133 Nm at 3,000 rpm. However this engine was never put into the production car. The dashboard was now completely redesigned, with "diary" mileage, buttons for adjusting the position of the headlights and timing the operation of the wipers, brake fluid level indicator, radio cassette player, as well as new door panels, in which the cassette speakers were mounted, and new seats with headrests. At the same time, the rear seats now had seat belts.

Since 1985, the station wagon model could also be bought by private individuals. The model range now consisted of eight trim levels: MS, MLS, S, TL, TX, TLX and TLE. The standard sedan model now had the 1,289 cm³ engine, four-speed gearbox, 155 R13 wheels with 155-13 TT tires, vertical grille and headlights, rear hood trim, chrome door handles with built-in buttons and yale, left exterior mirror, panel dashboard with dashboard, one-speed air conditioning fan, two-spoke steering wheel, ceiling handles, electrically operated windshield washer, parking brake warning light, round headlights and headlamps mounted on the bar. The MS trim had the following differences: inclined grille and headlights, rear hood spoiler, four-spoke steering wheel, heated rear window, front-rear side position lamps, windshield wiper timer. The MLS trim had the following differences: double braking circuit, brake fluid level indicator, restyled rims, plastic front spoiler, front seat headrest, oil pressure and water temperature indicators. The S trim had, among other things, the following differences: three-point fixed radiator, mirror protector, three-position side interior lamps, interior headlight adjustment control. The TL trim had the following differences: 155-13 TM tires, two-speed air conditioning fan. The top TLE trim had the following features: 1,397 cm³ engine, five-speed gearbox, fuel tank filter, braking servomechanism, pipe engine shield, black chrome door handles with separate yale, additional rear door lock, vertical fuel tank, restyled gearbox lever, restyled seats, carpeted trunk, front door storage boxes and side lamps for the number plate.

There was also the 1210 model, which was equipped with a 1.185 cm³ engine (bore x stroke: 70x77 mm), with a maximum power of 48 horsepower at 5,300 rpm, maximum torque 80 Nm at 3,000 rpm and compression ratio 8.5:1.

Dacia 1320

In 1987, the Dacia 1320 was launched, a hatchback inspired by the locally assembled Dacia 2000 and derived from the 1310 model. It was equipped with either a 1300 cc or a 1400 cc engine and manual gearboxes with 4 or 5 gears. The headlight grille has been completely redesigned, the double round headlights being replaced with single rectangular headlights. The exterior door handles have also been replaced by flush fitting ones, and the interior handles have also been redesigned - the action now being done by pulling inwards, as in most modern cars. Each door could be locked and unlocked from the inside, from the buttons located just below the opening handles. The 1320 kept the 1310's taillights, and unlike the later 1325 it did not get a rear windshield wiper.

History
The Dacia 1320 was a hatchback made from 1987 until 1990. It was actually the hatchback version of the second generation Dacia 1310 (1983–1989), but with new front grille, headlights and a much improved dashboard that were later used in the third generation Dacia 1310 (1989–1993). The front design was called "CN1", standing for Concepția Noastră 1, translated to "our creation 1". It was replaced by the Dacia 1325 Liberta in the early 1990s. The 1320 was sold for a comparably short period and only in 2,567 units. Most were used as taxis due to low sales, trying to eke out any sort of profitability. The 1320 had been created to rival the Lada Samara and Škoda Favorit but was flawed from the beginning. It got thinner sheet metal than the 1310 as well as a bad interior fit and finish.

Engines

Third generation (CN1; 1991)

The third generation 1310 had its debut in 1991. It underwent a small restyling, including the change of the front grille with 4 round headlights, now having 2 rectangular headlights taken from the Dacia 1320, spoiler built into the boot lid, an element created by engineer Ion Romică Sandu in 1990 and which was used until the end of production, a dark gray dashboard equipped with 2 air intakes located at its edge, plastic bumpers, and the introduction of metallic colors. In 1992, the 1289 cm³ and 54 hp engine and the 4-speed gearbox were discontinued, and at the end of 1994, a 1557 cm³ and 73 hp engine was introduced. Both the Break, hatchback and pick-up variants undergo the same changes, except for the trunk with the built-in spoiler. The Canada version also is discontinued. The 4-speed gearbox remains until 1997 on the 1400 cm³ pick-up variant.

Dacia 1325
Also during this period, the Dacia 1325 is launched, also known as the 1325 Liberta or simply the Liberta, which replaces the old Dacia 1320, and comes with a restyled back.

History
Produced from 1991 until 1996,the Dacia 1325 was the hatchback version of the third generation Dacia 1310 (1989–1993), as well as the hatchback version of the fourth generation 1310 (1993–1998). Some photos exist of the Dacia 1325 Liberta with the final CN4 front fascia, although rare, and the successor of Dacia 1320 (1987–1990), which was the hatchback version of the second generation Dacia 1310 (1983-1989).
At first it was just a copy of the old 1310, but in 1993 underwent a facelift similar to 1310's facelifting the same year and stayed in production until 1996.

Engines

Fourth generation (CN2; 1994)

CN1 was made until the middle of 1994, when another restyling took place, and CN2 was launched in the summer of 1994. Unlike its predecessor CN1, it came with a redesigned hood and new headlights adapted to it, a new grille and new plastic bumpers, available with or without fog lights, depending on the trim level. The highest trim level came with metallic paint, tinted windows, sunroof, and alloy wheels.

The CN2-series 1310 and 1410 were manufactured until June 1995.

Fifth generation (CN3; 1995)

With the launch of the Dacia Nova, another restyling was done, introducing 5.5Jx13 wheels. From now on, 165/70R13 tires are standard, although some 1557 cm³ models have also been equipped with 175/70R13. The following codes are used: L which means that the sedan comes with a 1400 cm engine, and T which means that the sedan comes with a 1600 cm engine. For the break variant, the notations CL and CT are adopted. Li, Ti, CLi, CTi are used for injection variants.

In 1997, a pick-up variant and a estate variant with a Peugeot engine of 1905 cm³ and 71 hp are presented. In 1999, the 4x4 version of the pick-up variants was launched. In 1996, due to poor sales, the production of the Dacia 1325 Liberta model ceased.

At the beginning of 1999, production ceased and it was followed by the CN4.

Sixth generation (CN4; 1999)

In 1999, the 1310 was restyled for the last time, using the CN4 code. It had headlights that had a new shape on the outside, but which kept the old rectangular reflector from the CN2 and CN3 models, being covered by the hood and the new grille. Also, the exterior door handles have been replaced with those from the Dacia Nova. In 1999, the Dacia Dedicație was launched, a limited edition meant to celebrate the occasion of the 40th anniversary of the launch of the Dacia 1300 model. They were available as sedan and estate, and were painted in two shades of gray, had aluminum rims and special side inscriptions.

In 2002, the badges and logo were changed, together with the name, to Dacia Berlină and Dacia Break, respectively, the name 1310 being abandoned. Due to the launch of the SuperNova model, especially the Europa trim, the sales of the regular sedan model decreased considerably, as the prices of the two were comparable. For example, a Dacia SuperNova Europa trim had the same price as the usual 1310 sedan, if you gave a car in exchange through the Rabla program (Dacia was the initiator of this program to renew the Romanian car fleet in 2000, to reduce the very large number of old and precarious cars in Romania, both brought from abroad and manufactured locally). Thus, starting with 2001, the sedan begins to be sold and produced in lower numbers. Sales were still quite good however, being bought mainly by taxi companies and driving schools. The estate model continued to have good sales until the model was finally discontinued in 2004.

In 2004, the production of the sedan and estate versions ceased, after more than three decades of existence, and the last car, number 1,959,730, left the assembly line of the Colibași factory on July 21.

Continued production (2004–2006)

Until 2006, only the pick-up variants remain in production, which continue to enjoy demand. On December 8, 2006, all versions of the Dacia pick-up were discontinued.

Gallery

See also

 Dacia 1320
 Dacia 1325 Liberta
 Dacia Pick-Up
 Dacia 1300
 Renault 12

References

External links

Dacia vehicles
Cars of Romania
Front-wheel-drive vehicles
Compact cars
Sedans
Cars introduced in 1979
Cars discontinued in 2004